Luz Range is a mountain range  long, including Petrellfjellet, Snobjorga Bluff and associated features, lying next east of the Gablenz Range in the Mühlig-Hofmann Mountains of Queen Maud Land, Antarctica. It was discovered by the Third German Antarctic Expedition under Alfred Ritscher, 1938–39, and named after the commercial director of the German Lufthansa Corporation.

References

Mountain ranges of Queen Maud Land
Princess Martha Coast